National Secondary Route 236, or just Route 236 (or ) is a National Road Route of Costa Rica, located in the Cartago province.

Description
In Cartago province the route covers Cartago canton (San Nicolás, Guadalupe districts), El Guarco canton (Tejar district).

References

Highways in Costa Rica